Malitoli is a surname. Notable people with the surname include:

Kenneth Malitoli (born 1966), Zambian footballer and manager
Mordon Malitoli (born 1968), Zambian footballer